Zajira is an upazila of Shariatpur District in the Division of Dhaka, Bangladesh. Zajira Thana was established in 1973 and was converted into an upazila in 1984. It is named after its administrative center, the town of Zajira.

Geography
About two-thirds is land and one-third is water, chiefly the Padma River, which flows through the northern part of the upazila. It borders Munshiganj District to the north, Naria Upazila to the east and south, Shariatpur Sadar Upazila to the south, and Madaripur District to the west.

Demographics

According to the 2011 Bangladesh census, Zajira Upazila had 14,715 households and a population of 194,019, 11.0% of whom lived in urban areas. 11.2% of the population was under the age of 5. The literacy rate (age 7 and over) was 44.4%, compared to the national average of 51.8%.

Administration
Zajira Upazila is divided into Zajira Municipality and 12 union parishads: Bara Gopalpur, Bara Krishnagar, Barakandi, Bilaspur, Zajira, Joynagor, Kunder Char, Mulna, Naodoba, Paler Char, Purba Naodoba, and Sener Char. The union parishads are subdivided into 126 mauzas and 200 villages.

Zajira Municipality is subdivided into 9 wards and 19 mahallas.

Education

There are three colleges in the upazila. They include Jajira College, Dr. Moslem Uddin Khan Degree College and BK. Nagar Bangabandhu College.
Jajira College located in Jajira Upazila Sadar.

The madrasa education system includes one fazil madrasa.

See also
 Upazilas of Bangladesh
 Districts of Bangladesh
 Divisions of Bangladesh

References

Upazilas of Shariatpur District